There have been six baronetcies created for persons with the surname Newton, three in the Baronetage of England, one in the Baronetage of Nova Scotia and two in the Baronetage of the United Kingdom.

The Newton Baronetcy, of Charlton in the County of Kent, was created in the Baronetage of England on 2 April 1620 for Adam Newton. The name of the baronetcy was changed to Puckering.

The Newton Baronetcy, of Barrs Court in the County of Gloucester, was created in the Baronetage of England on 16 August 1660 for John Newton. The second Baronet represented Grantham in the House of Commons. The fourth Baronet sat as Member of Parliament for Beverley and Grantham. He married Margaret Coningsby, 2nd Countess Coningsby (see Earl Coningsby). Newton had no surviving male issue and the title became extinct on his death in 1743.

The Newton Baronetcy, of London, was created in the Baronetage of England on 25 January 1661 for Robert Newton. The title became extinct on his death in 1670.

The Newton Baronetcy, of Newton in the County of Haddington, was created in the Baronetage of Nova Scotia on 23 April 1697 for Richard Newton. The title became extinct on his death in circa 1727.

The Newton Baronetcy, of The Wood, Sydenham Hill, Lewisham, in the County of Kent, and Kottingham House, Burton-on-Trent, in the County of Stafford, was created in the Baronetage of the United Kingdom on 18 May 1900 for Alfred Newton, Lord Mayor of London from 1899 to 1900. The second Baronet represented Harwich in the House of Commons as a Unionist between 1910 and 1922.

The Newton Baronetcy, of Beckenham in the County of Kent, was created in the Baronetage of the United Kingdom on 27 October 1924 for Sir Louis Newton, Lord Mayor of London from 1923 to 1924 and a member of the London County Council from 1931 to 1934.

Newton baronets, of Barrs Court (1660)

Sir John Newton, 1st Baronet (–1661)
Sir John Newton, 2nd Baronet (1626–1699)
Sir John Newton, 3rd Baronet (–1734)
Sir Michael Newton, 4th Baronet (–1743)

The first Sir John Newton belonged to an ancient Gloucestershire family, originally surnamed Caradoc.  He received his baronetcy as reward for providing King Charles II with troops to defend the plantation of Ulster.  The royal patent of 1660 that created the baronetcy stipulated that upon the death of the first baronet, who was childless, the honour would "revert" to his "kinsman" John Newton, resident of Culverthorpe, in Lincolnshire.  In reality, there was no family connection between the Gloucestershire and the Lincolnshire Newtons, and the arrangement seems to have been the result of the John Newton of Culverthorpe paying a large sum of money to his namesake in Gloucestershire.

Relationship to Isaac Newton 
Shortly after he was knighted by Queen Anne in 1705, the scientist Isaac Newton submitted to the College of Arms a genealogy claiming a common male-line ancestry with Sir John Newton, 3rd Baronet.  Modern genealogical scholarship confirms that they were third cousins. Sir Michael Newton, 4th Baronet, was chief mourner at the funeral of Sir Isaac Newton at Westminster Abbey, in 1727.

Newton baronets, of London (1661)
Sir Robert Newton, 1st Baronet (died 1670). He was a citizen of London and married Elizabeth (died 1661), daughter of Francis Langstone or Longston of London and Shropshire, and had a daughter, also called Elizabeth (died 1693), who married Sir John Baker, third Baronet and then Sir Philip Howard. He died without leaving male heirs in 1670.

Newton baronets, of Newton (1697)
Sir Richard Newton, 1st Baronet (died c. 1727)

Newton baronets, of The Wood and Kottingham House (1900)
Sir Alfred James Newton, 1st Baronet (1849–1921)
Sir Harry Kottingham Newton, 2nd Baronet (1875–1951)
Sir Harry Michael Rex Newton, 3rd Baronet (1923–2008)
The Rev. Sir George Peter Howgill Newton, 4th Baronet (born 1962)

Newton baronets, of Beckenham (1924)
Sir Louis Arthur Newton, 1st Baronet (1867–1945)
Sir Edgar Henry Newton, 2nd Baronet (1893–1971)
Sir Kenneth Garnar Newton, 3rd Baronet (1918–2008)
Sir John Garnar Newton, 4th Baronet (born 1945)

References
Kidd, Charles, Williamson, David (editors). Debrett's Peerage and Baronetage (1990 edition). New York: St Martin's Press, 1990.

Notes

Newton
Extinct baronetcies in the Baronetage of England
Extinct baronetcies in the Baronetage of Nova Scotia
1660 establishments in England